Dave Collins is an American Grammy Award winning mastering engineer. He has worked with numerous artists and musicians, including Alice in Chains, Metallica, Soundgarden, Weezer, Grateful Dead, Madonna, Linkin Park, The Police, Porno for Pyros, Oingo Boingo, Alice Cooper, KMFDM, Sepultura, Puscifier, Chris Cornell, Bon Jovi, Madonna, Buckcherry, Monster Magnet, Sting, Flogging Molly, Bad Religion, Black Sabbath, Blue Öyster Cult, Chevelle and Bruce Springsteen.

Collins has also mastered  motion picture soundtrack albums such as Fantastic Beasts and Where to Find Them, The Hunger Games: Catching Fire, The Hunger Games: Mockingjay – Part 2, Fantastic Beasts: The Crimes of Grindelwald, Passengers, Jurassic Park, Edward Scissorhands, The Nightmare Before Christmas, Schindler's List, and Braveheart.

Life and career
Dave Collins was born and raised in Hollywood Hills, California. Collins started his career in 1983 as an assistant to Armin Steiner, the American sound engineer and mixer. He worked with Steiner on the 20th Century Fox Scoring Stage until he was hired to work for Digital Magnetics, a new company created by Armin Steiner and his business partner Bruce Botnick, the American sound engineer and record producer. Collins worked as a recordist with the Sony Compact Disc Mastering System for Digital Magnetics in Hollywood from 1983 until 1988. In 1988, Collins was hired by Shelly Yakus, American recording engineer and mixer, to manage the mastering department of A&M Studios in Hollywood. In 1995, Dave Collins was promoted to oversee the four studios as Chief Mastering Engineer at A&M. Collins worked there as Chief Mastering Engineer for 14 years for until the studios were acquired by PolyGram Entertainment in 1999. After A&M’s closure, Dave Collins opened his own mastering studio on Western Avenue, Hollywood, California. In 2016, Collins moved to Pasadena after building two custom studios with Thomas Jouanjean by utilizing the principles of architectural acoustics. This location was also home to Hinge Studios owned by Craig Bauer the American mixing engineer. Collins is married to Christina Preston.

Awards and recognition
During his career, Collins has worked on 9 Grammy award winning projects and over 30 Grammy award nominated projects. Recently, Collins received two Grammys at the 58th Annual Grammy Awards for his mastering of D’Angelo’s 2016 record Black Messiah which won the Best R&B Album and Record of the Year.

Grammy awards

Selected Discography
 2019: Anita Wilson, Here’s to Life — Mastering
 2018: American Aquarium, Things Change — Mastering
 2018: Alice in Chains, Ranier Fog — Mastering
 2018: Fantastic Beasts: The Crimes of Grindelwald-Original Motion Picture Soundtrack — Mastering
 2018: Passengers-Original Motion Picture Soundtrack — Mastering
 2018: Victoria & Abdul-Original Motion Picture Soundtrack — Mastering
 2018: Bad Religion, The Kids Are Alt-Right — Mastering
 2017: Brendon Small, Galaktikon II: Become the Storm — Mastering
 2017: Seth Macfarlane, In Full Swing — Mastering
 2016: Bruce Springsteen, Chapter & Verse — Mastering
 2016: Metallica, Hardwired... to Self-Destruct — Mastering
 2016: D’Angelo, Black Messiah — Mastering
 2016: Chevelle, The North Corridor — Mastering
 2015: Puscifier, Money $hot — Mastering
 2015: Seth Macfarlane, No One Ever Tells You — Mastering
 2015: Buckcherry, Rock 'n' Roll — Mastering
 2014: Chevelle, La Gargola — Mastering
 2014: Maleficent, Original Motion Picture Soundtrack — Mastering
 2014: The Hunger Games: Mockingjay – Part 2, Original Motion Picture Soundtrack — Mastering
 2013: The Hunger Games: Catching Fire, Original Motion Picture Soundtrack — Mastering
 2013: Nancy Sinatra, Shifting Gears — Mastering
 2012: Avett Brothers, The Carpenter — Mastering
 2012: Soundgarden, The Classic Album Selection — Mastering
 2011: Chris Cornell, Songbook — Mastering
 2010: Weezer, Death to False Metal — Mastering
 2010: Toadies, Feeler — Mastering
 2010: Gin Blossoms, No Chocolate Cake — Mastering
 2010: Alain Johannes, Spark — Mastering
 2010: Barry Manilow, The Greatest Love Songs of All Time — Mastering
 2008: Sepultura, Against/Nation — Mastering
 2008: Flogging Molly, Float;— Mastering
 2007: Linkin Park, Minutes to Midnight — Mastering
 2008: Weezer, Red Album — Mastering
 2006: Superman Returns, Original Motion Picture Soundtrack — Mastering
 2006: Pink Panther, Original Motion Picture Soundtrack — Mastering
 2005: Blink-182, Greatest Hits — Mastering
 2002: Sting, At the Movies — Mastering
 2000: Alice Cooper, Brutal Planet — Mastering
 2000: Mötley Crüe, New Tattoo — Mastering
 1999: Chris Cornell, Euphoria Morning — Mastering
 1999: Perry Farrell, Rev — Mastering
 1998: Black Sabbath, Reunion — Mastering
 1997: Duran Duran, Medazzaland — Mastering
 1997: The Police, The Very Best of Sting & The Police — Mastering
 1997: Soundgarden, A-Sides — Mastering
 1996: Soundgarden, Down on the Upside — Mastering
 1996: Porno for Pyros, Good God's Urge — Mastering
 1996: Evita, Original Motion Picture Soundtrack — Mastering
 1994: Soundgarden-Superunknown — Mastering
 1993: Jurassic Park, Original Motion Film Soundtrack — Mastering
 1993: The Nightmare Before Christmas — Mastering
 1992: Batman Returns-Original Motion Picture Soundtrack — Mastering
 1991: Luther Vandross, Power of Love — Mastering
 1990: Edward Scissorhands, Original Motion Picture Soundtrack — Mastering

External links 
 Official website

References 

Living people
Grammy Award winners
Mastering engineers
American audio engineers
People from Los Angeles
Year of birth missing (living people)